Five Points, Michigan may refer to:

Five Points, Oakland County, Michigan, Oakland County, Michigan
Five Points, Shiawassee County, Michigan